Carolina Harbor is a water park at Carowinds amusement park in Charlotte, North Carolina. Included with the price of admission to Carowinds, the water park is owned and operated by Cedar Fair.

History
The water park originally opened as Ocean Island in 1982. In 1989, it was renamed to Riptide Reef. For the 1997 season, Paramount Parks invested $7 million in a  expansion and renamed the park to WaterWorks. Another major expansion occurred in 2006 adding a new Australian theme and changing the name to Boomerang Bay, a name shared with several water parks at other Cedar Fair amusement parks. As part of the multi-year expansion at Carowinds, Boomerang Bay added Surfer's Swell and Dorsal Fin Drop for the 2014 season.

On August 27, 2015, Carowinds announced that Boomerang Bay would undergo a major expansion in 2016 and would be renamed Carolina Harbor. The expansion includes a new wave pool named Surf Club Harbor, 2 children splash areas named Myrtle Turtle Beach and Kitty Hawk Cove, a six-story, six-slide complex named Blackbeard's Revenge, and a new play structure called Seaside Splashworks.

On August 15, 2019, Carowinds announced “Boogie Board Racer”, the longest mat racing slide in the southeast. This attraction has 6 separate enclosed, and open to the sun slides.

List of attractions

Former attractions

References

Cedar Fair water parks
Water parks in North Carolina
Water parks in South Carolina
Unincorporated communities in Mecklenburg County, North Carolina
Unincorporated communities in South Carolina
Unincorporated communities in North Carolina
1989 establishments in North Carolina
Amusement parks opened in 1989
Populated places established in 1989